The 1930 Saint Louis Billikens football team was an American football team that represented Saint Louis University during the 1930 college football season. In their first season under head coach Chile Walsh, the Billikens compiled a 3–3–2 record and outscored opponents by a total of 107 to 82. The team played its home games at its newly-constructed Edward J. Walsh Memorial Stadium in St. Louis. Halfback Harlan "Snakes" Gazelle was the team captain.

Schedule

References

Saint Louis
Saint Louis Billikens football seasons
Saint Louis Billikens football